The Taipei Football Association (TFA) is the governing body of football in Taipei, Taiwan.

Activities 
 Summer and winter futsal tournaments
 Spring and autumn football tournaments for primary- and junior-high-school students
 Football summer and winter camps

See also 
 Chinese Taipei Football Association
 Taipei Futsal Association

Football Association
Regional football associations in Taiwan
Football Association